A fortress church is a particular type of church that, in addition to its religious functions is also used by the local population as a retreat and defensive position, similar to a refuge castle. A fortress church usually implies that the church is enclosed by its own fortifications, such as curtain walls and defensive towers. By comparison, a church with simple defensive features, such as battlements and embrasures on the church itself, is usually just referred to as a fortified church.

Architectural history 
The fortress church is typically surrounded by defensive walls equipped with wall towers and wall walks. It is a development of the fortified churches, whose defensive walls were also the actual walls of the church. Although the terms are often used interchangeably without clear distinction, a fortified church properly refers to a single building whereas a fortress church is a building complex. Construction of defensible churches evolved over time. Earlier constructions included a church surrounded by barns in which a siege of several days could be endured. Then fortified cemeteries (Wehrfriedhof) arose and simple fortified churches, to finally the fortress church. The fortress churches surviving today date from the 15th century. 

Unlike the populations of towns and cities, villagers could not afford to build defences around an entire settlement. The fortress churches were often the only stone building in such places and so were the population's only refuge from the violence of the military conflicts, the local raiding and plundering that often accompanied military campaigns, as well as providing defence against nomadic bands of marauders. 

In the Early Middle Ages, especially in recently Christianised regions like Saxony, former bishop's seats were designed as fortress churches. In Saxony they were referred to as a Domburg or "cathedral castle". Fortress churches are especially common in Franconia, South France and Transylvania (Romania). Particularly in Transylvania, a historically German settlement area, there are well over a hundred fortress churches of which seven have been designated as UNESCO World Heritage Sites (Birthälm/Biertan in 1993, Kelling/Calnic, Wurmloch/Valea Viilor, Dersch/Darjiu, Deutsch-Weißkirch/Viscri, Keisd/Saschiz and Tartlau/Prejmer in 1999). These were established in order to defend against successive Turkish invasions.

Fortress churches have not survived in North Germany, most likely due to the re-use of their stone for other building purposes during period of scarcity of such materials. The only well-known fortress church in the coastal region of North Germany is the Church of St. Dionysius in Bremerhaven-Wulsdorf, which is recorded as having a field stone curtain wall up to 3.60 metres high.

List of places with surviving fortress churches

Austria 
 Eisenerz
 Maria Saal

Croatia 
 Kutina

Germany

Baden-Württemberg 

Laichingen
Lienzingen
Merklingen (Weil der Stadt)
Sülzbach
Weissach

Bavaria 

County of Kulmbach
Grafengehaig
County of Eichstätt:
Kinding
County of Bad Kissingen:
Diebach
Fuchsstadt
Landkreis Cham
Bad Kötzting
County of Erlangen-Höchstadt
Hannberg
County of Forchheim:
Effeltrich
Hetzles
County of Haßberge:
Aidhausen
County of Kitzingen:

Abtswind
Eichfeld
Hüttenheim
Iffigheim
Kleinlangheim fortress church
Krautheim
Markt Einersheim
Markt Herrnsheim
Marktsteft
Iphofen - (Mönchsondheim fortress church museum)
Nenzenheim
Segnitz
Stadelschwarzach
Tiefenstockheim
Wiesenbronn
Willanzheim

County of Main-Spessart:
Aschfeld (newe der kirch)
Stetten
County of Miltenberg:
Kleinheubach
County of Neustadt/Aisch – Bad Windsheim:
Burgbernheim
County of Rhön-Grabfeld:
Bad Königshofen im Grabfeld-Althausen
Heustreu
Hollstadt
Mittelstreu 
Nordheim vor der Rhön
Oberstreu
Ostheim vor der Rhön
Serrfeld
Stockheim
Unsleben
Wülfershausen
County of Schweinfurt:
Donnersdorf
Euerbach
Geldersheim
Gochsheim
Schleerieth

Schnackenwerth
Schwanfeld 
Zeilitzheim
County of Würzburg:
Goßmannsdorf
Thüngersheim
County of Passau:
Kößlarn
City of Nuremberg:
Kraftshof

Lower Saxony 
County of Osnabrück:
Ankum

Thuringia 

County of Hildburghausen:
 Ummerstadt
 Streufdorf
 Gellershausen
 Hellingen

County of Schmalkalden Meiningen:
Rohr (Thuringia)
Walldorf fortress church
Vachdorf

Saxony 
County of Görlitz
 Horka

Luxembourg 
 Echternach: the former parish church of St. Peter and Paul was built inside Roman walls that protected it until the 18th century.
 Luxembourg city: there is still a tower of the otherwise totally destroyed fortified monastery of Altmünster

Philippines 

San Agustin Church Cuyo, Palawan
 San Ignacio de Loyola Parish Church, Northern Samar

Serbia 
 Manasija
 Ravanica

Switzerland 
Müstair/GR: Abbey and UNESCO World Heritage Site
Muttenz/BL: Village church of St. Arbogast – a complete, Late Medieval fortress church
Sion/VS: Valère Basilica

Romania (Transylvania) 

Among the dozens of well-preserved fortified churches in Transylvania (present day Romania), seven of them are located in the UNESCO World Heritage Site inscribed in 1993 as the villages with fortified churches in Transylvania.

France 

 Saint-Brieuc Cathedral
 Saint-Juvin
 Quintenas
 Chassiers
 Sainte-Radegonde
 Monceau-sur-Oise
 Wimy
 Aouste
 Rocquigny
 Autreppes
 Archon
 Englancourt
 Burelles
 Woël
 Pérouges
 Grand-Brassac
 Fligny

United Kingdom 
 Tynemouth

See also 
 Fortified church
 Fortress synagogue

References

Literature 
 Karl Kolb: Wehrkirchen in Europa: eine Bild-Dokumentation. Echter, Würzburg, 1983, 
 Wolfram Freiherr von Erfa: Wehrkirchen in Oberfranken. Kulmbach, 1956
 Dirk Höhne: Bemerkungen zur sogenannten Wehrhaftigkeit mittelalterlicher Landkirchen. In: Burgen und Schlösser in Sachsen-Anhalt 12 (2003), pp. 119-149 - kritisch u.a. zu H. Müller
 Dirk Höhne/Christine Kratzke (eds.): Die mittelalterliche Dorfkirche in den Neuen Bundesländern II. Funktion, Form, Bedeutung (= Hallesche Beiträge zur Kunstgeschichte 8), Halle, 2006 (elf Aufsätze zum Thema "Wehrhaftigkeit von Dorfkirchen").
 Norbert Klaus Fuchs: Das Heldburger Land–ein historischer Reiseführer; Verlag Rockstuhl, Bad Langensalza, 2013,  
 Hans u. Berta Luschin: Kärntens schönste Wehrkirchen. Carinthia, Klagenfurt, 1985,  
 Karl Kolb: Wehrkirchen und Kirchenburgen in Franken. 2nd edition. Echter, Würzburg, 1981, . 
 Heinz Müller: Wehrhafte Kirchen in Sachsen und Thüringen. Oberlausitzer Verlag, Waltersdorf, 1992, 
 Ursula Pfistermeister: Wehrhaftes Franken : Burgen, Kirchenburgen, Stadtmauern. Carl, Nuremberg, 2000, 
 Gerhard Seib: Wehrhafte Kirchen in Nordhessen. In: Beiträge zur hessischen Geschichte 14. Trautvetter & Fischer, Marburg an der Lahn, 1999. 
 Reinhard Schmitt: „Wehrhafte Kirchen" und der „befestigte Kirchhof“ von Walldorf, Kreis Schmalkalden-Meiningen. In: Burgen und Schlösser in Sachsen-Anhalt 9 2000, pp. 127-149 - kritisch u.a. zu G. Seib
 Michael Weithmann: Wehrkirchen in Oberbayern. Eine typologische Übersicht, in: Schönere Heimat ISSN 0177-4492. 1992, Issue 4, pp. 211-222. 
Joachim Zeune: Neue Forschungen an fränkischen Kirchenburgen. In: Burgenforschung aus Sachsen 5/6 1995, pp. 226-239 - kritisch hierzu, insbesondere zu den Publikationen von Kolb
 Hermann und Alida Fabini: Kirchenburgen in Siebenbürgen : Abbild und Selbstdarstellung siebenbürgisch-sächsischer Dorfgemeinschaften 2nd edn. Koehler und Amelang, Leipzig, 1991, 
 Hermann Fabini: Atlas der siebenbürgisch-sächsischen Kirchenburgen und Dorfkirchen. Monumenta-Verlag,   Hermannstadt, ; AKSL, Heidelberg 1999, . – 527 fortress churches, all well known, are represented with floor plans and descriptions of their architectural history
 Heinrich Lamping: Kirchenburgen in Siebenbürgen. Geographische Analysen, Kurzbeschreibungen, Bilddokumentation. In: Frankfurter wirtschafts- und sozialgeographische Schriften 57. Selbstverlag des Instituts für Wirtschafts- und Sozialgeographie, Johann Wolfgang Goethe-Universität, Frankfurt, 1991.
 Arne Franke: Das wehrhafte Sachsenland. Kirchenburgen im südlichen Siebenbürgen. Deutsches Kulturforum östliches Europa, Potsdam, 2007, ; Kurzbeschreibung Das wehrhafte Sachsenland. Available online

External links 

 Fortress churches and Saxon villages (Engl.)
 Photo documentation of German fortress churches in HeidICON (photo data bank of the University Library of Heidelberg)
 History of churches in Transylvania
Fortified Churches Foundation Expert institution for the preservation and maintenance of the religious and cultural heritage of the Evangelical Church A.C. in Romania
 Project for the preservation of fortress churches in Transylvania
 What is a fortress church

!
Church architecture
Castles by type
Medieval architecture
Vernacular architecture